Dennis Creehan (born August 16, 1949) is an American gridiron football coach. He was most recently the athletic director at Alderson Broaddus University from 2011 to 2019.

Creehan served as the head football coach at Edinboro University of Pennsylvania (1979–1984), San Francisco State University (1990), the University of South Dakota (1992–1996), West Virginia Wesleyan College (2009–2010), and Alderson Broaddus (2012–2016). He is the only coach to have ever earned Coach of the Year awards in four conferences. He was a coach in The Spring League in 2017 and 2018. In October 2018, he was announced as the linebackers coach for the Salt Lake Stallions of the Alliance of American Football. Creehan took a leave of absence from Alderson Broaddus to accommodate the coaching position; the university named Carrie Bodkins his permanent replacement in May 2019.

Head coaching record

References

External links
 Alderson Broaddus profile

1949 births
Living people
Alderson Broaddus Battlers athletic directors
Alderson Broaddus Battlers football coaches
Arkansas State Red Wolves football coaches
Army Black Knights football coaches
California Golden Bears football coaches
Carnegie Mellon Tartans football coaches
Duquesne University alumni
Duke Blue Devils football coaches
Edinboro Fighting Scots football coaches
Edmonton Elks coaches
High school football coaches in Pennsylvania
Pittsburgh Panthers football coaches
Rutgers Scarlet Knights football coaches
Salt Lake Stallions coaches
San Francisco State Gators football coaches
South Dakota Coyotes football coaches
Sportspeople from Pittsburgh
University of Pittsburgh alumni
West Virginia Wesleyan Bobcats football coaches
The Spring League coaches